Ljubomir Mihajlović (born 4 September 1943) is a former Yugoslav and Serbian footballer who played as a defender.

Club career
Mihajlović played for Partizan between 1961 and 1970, winning three Yugoslav First League titles (1961–62, 1962–63, and 1964–65). He was a member of the team that lost the 1966 European Cup Final to Real Madrid. In 1970, Mihajlović moved abroad to France and joined Lyon, spending there the next seven seasons. He made 233 appearances and scored one goal in the French top flight.

International career
At international level, Mihajlović was capped six times for Yugoslavia. He was a member of the team at UEFA Euro 1968, as Yugoslavia lost in the final to Italy.

Honours

Club
Partizan
 Yugoslav First League: 1961–62, 1962–63, 1964–65

International
Yugoslavia
 UEFA European Championship: Runner-up 1968

References

External links
 
 
 

Association football defenders
Expatriate footballers in France
FK Partizan players
Ligue 1 players
Olympique Lyonnais players
Serbian footballers
Footballers from Belgrade
UEFA Euro 1968 players
Yugoslav expatriate footballers
Yugoslav expatriates in France
Yugoslav First League players
Yugoslav footballers
Yugoslavia international footballers
1943 births
Living people